The Picton–Mittagong Loop Line is a partly disused railway line between the towns of Picton and Mittagong in the Southern Highlands of New South Wales, Australia.

History
The Picton–Mittagong line was opened in February 1867 as part of the Main South line.

The line ran north-northwest from Picton, over the Picton Viaduct, across the Great South Road before heading northwest. It then headed west-northwest through a  tunnel in the Redbank Range.

Stations were constructed at Redbank (1885), Couridjah (1867), Buxton (1893), 
Balmoral (1878), Hill Top (1878), Colo Vale (1883) and Braemar (1867). There were a number of smaller stops, sidings and passing loops along the line, as well. North of Hill Top, the cutting through Big Hill was for many years the deepest in Australia. The rock-cut inscription dated 1863, commemorating the deaths of two men in an explosion during the excavation of the cutting, north of Hill Top, is considered one of the oldest in Australia.

To service the line, Picton became a busy station with a locomotive depot for bank engines, dormitories for train crews, and goods sidings.

The line, while gently curved, had gradients as steep as 1 in 30. It was also a single-track line, and even though deviations were constructed between Hill Top and Colo Vale to ease grades, these factors combined to create a bottleneck, as rail traffic increased. In July 1919 a new double track alignment with ruling 1 in 75 grades between Picton and Mittagong via Bargo opened. The original proposal was for the line to be shifted considerably further eastwards from Appin to Bargo avoiding Picton. This was strongly opposed in Parliament by Picton local interests, hence the 180° curve that circumnavigates the town. The old line, now renamed the Loop Line, continued to be served by passenger services until August 1978. Most services were operated by 30 class locomotives and later CPH railmotors, although there was a Sunday evening service to Sydney hauled by main line locomotives as recently as 1973.

From the 1960s the line was popular with steam hauled specials, and was the preferred route for most journeys where they could operate without inhibiting regular services.

Following it relocating to Thirlmere, in June 1976 the New South Wales Rail Transport Museum (NSW Rail Museum) commenced operating steam services on the line between Picton and Buxton.

The line remained open throughout, although by the 1980s the Buxton to Braemar section saw little use. CPH railmotor CPH22 ran a trip to Braemar and three shuttles between Braemar and Hilltop on 31 May 1987, before a trestle bridge between Colo Vale and Braemar suffered flood damage, resulting in the line being divided into two separate branches in September 1987.

Following the Department for Transport calling for expressions of interest for using a number of disused lines, the New South Wales Rail Transport Museum was granted a lease over the Picton to Buxton section in 1993.

The Mittagong Junction to Braemar section remains open to give access to the Bradken rolling stock and Rocla concrete sleeper facilities.

On 1 March 2019, the NSW Government promised to fund the re-opening of the Picton Loop Line, including the track between Buxton and Colo Vale. The grant will also fund the construction of new platforms at Hill Top and Balmoral.

Coach route
NSW TrainLink operates buses in lieu of the former rail service. Six services are provided under contract by Berrima Buslines from Bowral and seven from Picton on weekdays only with stops at:

Picton station
Barbour Road, Thirlmere
West Parade, Couridjah
West Parade, Buxton
Wilson Drive, Balmoral
Wilson Drive, Hill Top
Wilson Drive & Church Avenue, Colo Vale
Mittagong station
Bowral station

Gallery

References

External links
 Return of steam trains on reclaimed rail trail 2021 ABC News article about proposed combined rail trail and steam train operations.

Regional railway lines in New South Wales
Standard gauge railways in Australia
Railway lines opened in 1867
Mittagong, New South Wales